United States gubernatorial elections were held on November 7, 1989, in two states and one territory, as well as other statewide offices and members of state legislatures. Democrats picked up the open seat in New Jersey formerly held by a Republican while keeping another open seat in Virginia held by a Democrat.

Election results

 
November 1989 events in the United States